Emesopsis is a genus of tropical bugs (Heteroptera) from the family Reduviidae. There are at least 22 described species, of which one, E. nubila, also occurs in southern Europe.

The representatives of this genus are mostly relatively small, and measure a few millimeters to about one centimeter.

They move, as is common for the bugs of the subfamily Emesinae, with their back and middle legs. The raptorial front legs serve to capture prey. With them, the prey is captured, then bitten through with the mandibles and carried away. Then it is drained, which can sometimes take half an hour. Emesopsis prey on a variety of insect groups, ranging from beetles, bugs, flies, to springtails.

Habitat and distribution

The species of the genus Emesopsis be found both in agricultural and forest ecosystems.

They occur primarily in tropical Asia (e.g. India, Thailand, Malaysia, Vietnam, Japan, New Guinea) and Australia (e.g. E. bunda in Queensland). Only E. nubila is pantropical, probably a consequence of the spread of global trade.

partial species list

Emesopsis aberrans (Distant, 1909)
Emesopsis aemula (Horvath, 1914)
Emesopsis albispinosa Ishikawa & Okajima, 2004
Emesopsis amoenus Wygodzinsky & Usinger, 1960 
Emesopsis bellulus Wygodzinsky & Usinger, 1960 
Emesopsis bunda Wygodzinsky, 1956 
Emesopsis decoris Wygodzinsky & Usinger, 1960 
Emesopsis gaius McAtee & Malloch, 1926 
Emesopsis gallienus McAtee & Malloch, 1926 
Emesopsis habros Wygodzinsky & Usinger, 1960 
Emesopsis hadrian McAtee & Malloch, 1926 Hadrian 
Emesopsis imbellis (Horvath, 1914) 
Emesopsis infenestra Tatarnic, Wall & Cassis, 2011
Emesopsis longipilosa Ishikawa & Okajima, 2004 
Emesopsis medusa (Kirkaldy, 1908) 
Emesopsis nero McAtee & Malloch, 1926 
Emesopsis nubila Uhler, 1893 
Emesopsis obsoletus McAtee & Malloch, 1926 
Emesopsis pallidicoxa (Usinger, 1946) 
Emesopsis plagiatus Miller, 1941 
Emesopsis scitulus Wygodzinsky & Usinger, 1960 
Emesopsis spicatus McAtee & Malloch, 1926 
Emesopsis streiti Kovac & Yang, 1995

References

Reduviidae
Hemiptera of Asia
Taxa named by Philip Reese Uhler